Eatoniella bathamae is a species of marine gastropod mollusc in the family Eatoniellidae. It was first described by Winston F. Ponder in 1965. It is endemic to the waters of New Zealand.

Taxonomy 

The species was originally identified by the name Eatoniella (Cerostraca) bathami, named after Betty Batham who assisted Ponder during his stay at the Portobello Marine Laboratory.

Description

Eatoniella bathamae has a small conical shell, smooth except for the presence of faint growth lines. It has a variable colour, typically dark grey-purple, but including pale grey and yellowish-white. The holotype specimen measured 1.42mm by 0.8mm.

Distribution
The species is endemic to New Zealand. The holotype of the species was collected on 5 September 1963 at Little Papanui Beach, Dunedin, by Ponder himself, who identified the species on gelatinous red algae. In addition to Otago, specimens have been identified on the Snares Islands / Tini Heke, Stewart Island and the Auckland Islands.

References

Eatoniellidae
Gastropods described in 1965
Gastropods of New Zealand
Endemic fauna of New Zealand
Endemic molluscs of New Zealand
Molluscs of the Pacific Ocean
Taxa named by Winston Ponder